Frank Adisson (born 24 July 1969, in Tarbes) is a French slalom canoeist. He competed from the late 1980s to the early 2000s, in three Summer Olympics. He won two medals in the C2 event with a gold medal in 1996 and a bronze medal in 1992.

Frank Adisson also won four medals in the C2 event at the ICF Canoe Slalom World Championships with two golds in (1991, 1997), a silver in (1995), and a bronze in (1993). He earned 5 more medals in the C2 team event (2 golds, 2 silvers and 1 bronze).

He won the World Cup series in C2 in 1996 and 1997. He also won a silver medal in the C2 event at the 2000 European Championships.

His partner in the boat throughout the whole of his career was Wilfrid Forgues (now known as Sandra Forgues).

Frank Adisson is also a graduate of the EM Lyon Business School.

World Cup individual podiums

References

DatabaseOlympics.com profile

1969 births
Canoeists at the 1992 Summer Olympics
Canoeists at the 1996 Summer Olympics
Canoeists at the 2000 Summer Olympics
French male canoeists
Living people
Sportspeople from Tarbes
Emlyon Business School alumni
Olympic canoeists of France
Olympic gold medalists for France
Olympic bronze medalists for France
Olympic medalists in canoeing
Medalists at the 1996 Summer Olympics
Medalists at the 1992 Summer Olympics
Medalists at the ICF Canoe Slalom World Championships
20th-century French people